Cadillac Desert (1986), is a history by American Marc Reisner about land development and water policy in the western United States. Subtitled The American West and Its Disappearing Water, it explores the history of the federal agencies, Bureau of Reclamation and U.S. Army Corps of Engineers, and their struggles to remake the American West in ways to satisfy national settlement goals. The book concludes that the development-driven policies, formed when settling the West was the country's main concern, have had serious long-term negative effects on the environment and water quantity. The book was revised and updated in 1993.

Topics discussed

Army Corps of Engineers
Bureau of Reclamation
California Aqueduct
California Water Wars
Central Arizona Project
Colorado River
Colorado River Storage Project
David Brower
Floyd Dominy
Garrison Dam
Glen Canyon Dam
Grand Coulee Dam
Hoover Dam
Klamath Diversion
Los Angeles Department of Water and Power
Manifest Destiny
Mono Lake
Native Americans
NAWAPA
Ogallala Aquifer
Owens Valley
Powell Geographic Expedition of 1869
"Rain follows the plow"
St. Francis Dam
Snail darter controversy
Stewart Lee Udall
Teton Dam
William Mulholland

Adaptations and representations in other media 
A portion of the 1993 update was printed in the 1994 inaugural edition of the Hastings West-Northwest Journal of Environmental Law and Policy.

A four-part television documentary based on the revised book was produced in 1996 by KTEH, the PBS affiliate in San Jose, California

This book has been referred to in 21st-century fiction about the effects of climate change (so-called climate fiction), such as Paolo Bacigalupi's The Water Knife (2015), a thriller set in the near-future. Several characters refer to Cadillac Desert as having anticipated the environmental decline they are living through. The physical book also plays an important role. Claire Vaye Watkins refers to Cadillac Desert as a source in her acknowledgments for her novel, Gold Fame Citrus (2015).

References 

1986 non-fiction books
Water in California
History books about the United States
Books about California
Viking Press books